Jean-Baptiste Baronian born as Joseph Lous Baronian also known as Alexandre Lous (born 29 April 1942) is a French-language Belgian writer of Armenian descent.  He was born in Antwerp, Belgium. Baronian is a critic, essayist, children's book writer and novelist.

References

1942 births
Living people
20th-century Belgian novelists
Belgian male novelists
Belgian writers in French
Belgian people of Armenian descent
Writers from Antwerp
20th-century Belgian male writers